Ariston was a Greek cavalry officer at the battle of Gaugamela, where his squadron was stationed between those of Glaucias and Sopolis.

References
Who's who in the age of Alexander the Great: prosopography of Alexander's empire  

Generals of Alexander the Great
Ancient Macedonian generals
4th-century BC Macedonians